Greg Luke Pitts (born January 21, 1970) is an American actor. He is best known for his role as Drew in the film Office Space.

Career
He has taken bit roles in films and television series, including Grey's Anatomy and Sons & Daughters, and was featured as "Vincent" in Allstate Insurance advertisements with sidekick Andrew Hawtrey as "Bergwood".

Pitts graduated from the University of South Florida in 1992 with a degree in Theatre. He was a member of Pi Kappa Alpha fraternity at the University of South Florida.

Filmography

Feature films

Television

Shorts

References

External links 
Artist Profile
Greg Pitts on Myspace

Living people
1970 births
American male film actors
Male actors from Florida
University of South Florida alumni
American male television actors
Actors from Sarasota, Florida